was a Japanese biochemist, famous for research on chemical carcinogens. He received the Japan Prize for the contribution to establishment of fundamental concept on causes of cancer. He was elected as President of the Japan Academy on October 15, 2013, serving till 2016 and was replaced with Hiroshi Shiono.

Contribution
Sugimura isolated and identified many mutagens with a structure of heterocyclic amine from foods cooked under ordinary conditions. He showed that tumors induced by these heterocyclic amines had genetic alterations. He further developed his studies to analyze multiple-step carcinogenesis at molecular levels to promote effective primary prevention of cancer. His group identified the novel polymer poly(ADP-ribose) and demonstrated the presence of the enzyme poly ADP ribose polymerase (PARP). He also discovered the cognate catabolic enzyme, poly(ADP-ribose) glycohydrolase (PARG) and further elucidated the biology of poly(ADP-ribose). The discovery of pierisin, an apoptogenic peptide that ADP-ribosylates DNA, profoundly illuminates his scientific character and curiosity as well.

Biography
Sugimura completed his M.D. in 1949 from the Faculty of Medicine, University of Tokyo, and received the degree of Doctor of Medical Science in 1957 from the same institution. After his postdoctoral fellowship at the Cancer Institute, Japanese Foundation for Cancer Research, he became Chief of Biochemistry Division at the Research Institute, National Cancer Center in Tokyo in 1962, where he served as President from 1984 to 1991. In addition, he was Professor of Institute of Medical Science, University of Tokyo from 1970 to 1985 and President of Toho University from 1994 to 2000. He was Fellow of the American Association for Cancer Research (AACR) Academy, Honorary Member of Japanese Cancer Association and also President Emeritus of National Cancer Center.

Recognition
Sugimura received numerous awards and honors which include the following:

Awards
1976 Imperial Prize of the Japan Academy 
1977 Fogarty Scholar in Residence, National Institutes of Health, USA
1978 Outstanding Work Award, Environmental Mutagen Society of the United States
1981 Order of Culture
1981 Charles S. Mott Prize 
1992 Tomizo Yoshida Award of the Japanese Cancer Association
1996 National Order of Merit (France) (Officer)
1997 Japan Prize

Honors
1982 Foreign Associate, the National Academy of Sciences, USA 
1982 Member, the Japan Academy. 
1987 Foreign Member, the Royal Netherlands Academy of Arts and Sciences (Division for Sciences)
1987 Foreign Member, the Royal Swedish Academy of Sciences (Class for Medical Sciences) 
1994 Foreign Associate, the Institute of Medicine, National Academy of Sciences, USA

See also
List of members of the National Academy of Sciences (Medical genetics, hematology, and oncology)

References

1926 births
2020 deaths
Cancer researchers
Japanese biochemists
Foreign associates of the National Academy of Sciences
Members of the Royal Netherlands Academy of Arts and Sciences
Members of the Royal Swedish Academy of Sciences
Members of the National Academy of Medicine
Laureates of the Imperial Prize
Recipients of the Order of Culture
Academic staff of the University of Tokyo
University of Tokyo alumni